Amman Valley may refer to:
The valley of the River Amman
Amman Valley Hospital
Amman Valley Railway
Amman Valley Railway Society
Amman Valley School